The game of chess has a history of being played in the continent of Africa. Its play in South Africa is of particular interest to chess writers and historians.

The board game senet preceded chess and was favored by Ancient Egyptian royalty. Chess is thought to have first made its way to Africa through shatranj. As the Muslim conquest of Persia occurred, the Muslims took and modified chatrang, adopting it as shatraj. Shantraj is recognized as the immediate predecessor to chess. While chess in Europe has received considerable more attention by chess historians, it is thought that the game made its way to Europe from the Moors of North Africa.

Senterej is another component of the history of chess in Africa as it is considered the "Ethiopian version of chess". Having been played for over a thousand years, its popularity waned in the 20th and 21st centuries.

In 1998, the African Chess Championship began being held. The most recent edition held in 2022 saw Egyptian players dominate. Since 2003, chess has also been played at the African Games.

As a child, Phiona Mutesi enrolled in a chess club in Katwe, Uganda in 2005. Her success in chess garnered international attention, including a 2016 Disney-produced film Queen of Katwe.

From 2014 to 2021, the continent produced six grandmasters; Algeria, Egypt, and South Africa were among the countries to be represented by a grandmaster.

After returning to his home slum in Nigeria in 2018, chess master Tunde Onakoya founded Chess in Slums Africa, a volunteer organization aiming to teach and coach chess to children of low-income communities. Also in 2018, James Kangaru of Kenya was recognized by the International Chess Federation (or FIDE) as one of the best chess coaches and became Africa's youngest FIDE instructor.

See also

Chess in Armenia
Chess in India
Chess in Spain
Geography of chess

References

Further reading

Chess in Africa
History of chess